Dedovsk is the name of several inhabited localities in Russia.

Urban localities
Dedovsk, a town in Istrinsky District of Moscow Oblast

Rural localities
Dedovsk, Bryansk Oblast, a village in Dubrovsky Rural Administrative Okrug of Surazhsky District in Bryansk Oblast;